Gräfenthal is a town in the district of Saalfeld-Rudolstadt in Thuringia, Germany.

Geography 

Gräfenthal is located in the southern Thüringer Schiefergebirge, a low mountain range south-eastern of the better known Thuringian Forest. Mountains in this region rise up to 800 meters above sea level and are usually wooded with spruce trees. 20 km north-eastern of Gräfenthal lies district town Saalfeld.

Neighboring municipalities (clockwise, starting northwards) are: Reichmannsdorf, Probstzella, Ludwigsstadt, Tettau, Oberland am Rennsteig, Piesau, Lichte, Schmiedefeld

Gräfenthal has 8 subdivisions:
Buchbach
Creunitz
Gebersdorf
Gräfenthal
Großneundorf
Lichtenhain
Lippelsdorf
Sommersdorf

History 
In 1288 the town was first mentioned.  It was for much of its early history under various Ernestine princelings.

Number of inhabitants

 1994: 3.146
 1997: 3.036
 2000: 2.913
 2003: 2.808
 2006: 2.692
 2009: 2.499
 2012: 2.150
 2014: 2.056

Pictures

Buildings 
Castle Wespenstein 
Grenz- und Heimatmuseum Gräfenthal
Town church, with restored Art Nouveau mural paintings.
Railway viaduct

Economy and infrastructure 

Erstwhile mining and the location at the route for commerce between Nuremberg and Leipzig were important economical factors. Mainly iron, slate and alum had been mined. During the 20th century Gräfenthal was well known for its porcelain products. From the formerly three manufactories only one is still in existence. Today a plastics factory is the main employer.

Gräfenthal lies on the road between Neuhaus am Rennweg and Probstzella. Further roads lead to surrounding municipalities. The town used to be connected to the railway-system up until the line section between Sonneberg and Probstzella became disused due to lacking profitability.

Sons and daughters of the town

 Reinhard Höhn (1904-2000), state and administrative lawyer in the Period of National Socialism
 Helmut Lipfert (1916-1990), Luftwaffe officer in World War II
 Christian Paschold (born 1949), sculptor, artist

References 

Saalfeld-Rudolstadt
Duchy of Saxe-Meiningen